Liodesina is a genus of moths in the family Geometridae first described by Wehrli in 1938.

Species
Liodesina homochromata (Mabille, 1869)

References

External links
Fauna Europaea

Geometridae